Ponometia erastrioides, the small bird-dropping moth or small bird lime moth, is a moth of the family Noctuidae. It is found in North America, where it has been recorded from the eastern United States and south-central Canada (Quebec, Ontario, Saskatchewan). The habitat consists of fields, waste places and riparian areas.

The wingspan is 16–20 mm. The forewings are white with large diagonal blackish patch in the distal half. The hindwings are whitish, basally with greyish-brown shading distally. Adults are on wing from May to September.

The larvae feed on Ambrosia species. They are tan to nearly black or sometimes pale green. Full-grown larvae reach a length of 25 mm.

References

Moths described in 1852
Acontiinae